Masami Yokoyama (横山雅美 Yokoyama Masami, born December 12, 1981) is a Japanese volleyball player who plays for Igtisadchi Baku.

Clubs
Bunkyojoshi univ. Junior High → Seitoku Gakuen High School → Kaetujoshi college → Denso Airybees (2002-2010) → Hitachi Rivale(2010-2011) →  Igtisadchi Baku

National team
 Universiade national team (2001,2003)
 World Grand Prix 2005

Honors
Team
Japan Volleyball League/V.League/V.Premier　Runners-up (1): 2007-2008
Kurowashiki All Japan Volleyball Championship　Champions (1): 2008

References

External links
Denso Official Website Profile
Azerivolley.com

Japanese women's volleyball players
Living people
1981 births
Volleyball players at the 2010 Asian Games
Asian Games competitors for Japan